The Jovian–Plutonian gravitational effect was a hoax phenomenon purported to cause a noticeable short-term reduction in gravity on Earth that was invented for April Fools' Day by the English astronomer Patrick Moore and broadcast on BBC Radio 2 on 1 April 1976.

Background

Patrick Moore (4 March 1923 – 9 December 2012) was the doyen of British television astronomers, boasting a long career in public service broadcasting, a quick-fire manner of speech, and a number of eccentric habits, including the wearing of a monocle. A wartime navigator in the Royal Air Force's Bomber Command, he was elected a Fellow of the Royal Astronomical Society in 1945 and presented BBC Television's The Sky at Night programme from 1957 until his death. He was appointed an Officer of the Order of the British Empire in 1968. Above all, Moore had a high level of public recognition in the United Kingdom as a respected astronomer.

The planet Jupiter is two and a half times as massive as all of the other planets in the Solar System combined.

Pluto is so small and so remote from the Sun and the Earth that it was not discovered until 1930. It was classified as a planet at the time and remained as such for 76 years until 2006, when the International Astronomical Union reclassified it as a dwarf planet, as it belongs to a belt of many similar small objects.
Thus, at the time of the hoax, Pluto was considered to be the ninth planet in the solar system.

Events of April 1976
On 1 April 1976, Moore stated to radio listeners that an astronomical event would take place at 9:47 a.m. that day, a conjunction of Jupiter and Pluto, which was expected to have an effect observable everywhere. As Pluto passed behind Jupiter, it would briefly cause a powerful combination of the two planets' gravitational forces which would noticeably decrease gravity on Earth. If listeners were to jump into the air at that exact moment, they would find they felt a floating sensation.

Soon after 9:47 on that morning, the BBC began to receive hundreds of telephone calls from people reporting they had observed the decrease in gravity. One woman who called in even stated that she and eleven friends had been sitting and had been "wafted from their chairs and orbited gently around the room".

The story was quickly revealed as an April Fools' Day hoax. Martin Wainwright later wrote in The Guardian that Moore was "an ideal presenter" to carry off the hoax, with his weighty delivery having "an added air of batty enthusiasm that only added to his credibility".

In 1980, Moore collaborated with Clyde Tombaugh, the man who had discovered Pluto in 1930, to publish a new book about the dwarf planet.

See also

 Pluto in fiction
 Jupiter in fiction
 The Jupiter Effect
 The War of the Worlds (radio drama)

Notes

References
Tombaugh, Clyde W., Pluto in The Astronomy Encyclopaedia, ed. Patrick Moore (London, M. Beazley, 1987)

External links
sirpatrickmoore.com - official site

April Fools' Day jokes
Journalistic hoaxes
Hoaxes in the United Kingdom
1976 hoaxes
April 1976 events in the United Kingdom
Jupiter
Pluto